Andrej Kiska (born 2 February 1963) is a Slovak politician, entrepreneur, writer  and philanthropist who served as the fourth president of Slovakia from 2014 to 2019. He ran as an independent candidate in the 2014 presidential election in which he was elected to the presidency in the second round of voting over Prime Minister Robert Fico. Kiska declined to run for a second term in 2019. He has written two books about happiness, success and his life.

Biography

Early and personal life
Kiska was born in Poprad. He studied electrical engineering. His father was an active member of the ruling Communist Party of Slovakia (KSS). He also applied for Communist party membership, but was rejected.

They had two children, Andrej Kiska (1986) and Natália Kisková (1990). The couple divorced in 2001 after 18 years of marriage.

Kiska married his second wife, Martina Kisková, in 2003. The couple have three children- - Veronika (born 2005), Viktor (born 2009), and Martin (born July 2017 during his presidency).

He is an ethnic Goral.

Career
In 1990, after the Velvet Revolution, he moved to the United States. Later he founded Triangel and Quatro, two Slovakia-based hire-purchase companies that give the buyer the possibility to pay for goods in several installments over a number of months instead of paying the full price at once.

Tax authorities accused his co-owned company KTAG (with his brother Jaroslav) of tax non-compliance and under-payments, regarding expenses for his presidential campaign. The company eventually agreed to pay the taxes and a penalty.

Tax non-compliance and legal problems

Andrej Kiska's companies were involved in a number of tax-non compliance issues. Improperly reported income from various business activities resulted in a smaller VAT and Income tax payments.

In his personal tax filing he did not disclose personal propagation before elections performed by his company as a non-cash income, but claimed that he paid for it. Eventually tax office confirmed he did not pay, did not report non-cash income, and his company did not report income from propagation activities but fully deducted all VAT. Remaining costs additionally decreased tax base.

Philanthropy
In 2006, Kiska co-founded a non-profit charitable organization called Dobrý anjel (translated as Good Angel), in which donors help families that have found themselves in a difficult financial situation as a result of a family member contracting a serious disease (such as cancer). By 2016, more than 170,000 people have donated to this organization in Slovakia. In 2014 Good Angel expanded their activities also to Czech Republic, where 60.000 are paying their monthly contributions in 2016. In addition to that, Kiska donates his monthly presidential salary to people in need.

Presidency

In the first round of the 2014 Slovak presidential election, Kiska placed second with 24% of the vote, behind Prime Minister Robert Fico (28%). As none of candidates got more than 50% of votes, Kiska and Fico progressed to a presidential runoff vote on 29 March 2014. With the support of right-wing parties and other defeated candidates, Kiska won decisively in the second round, receiving nearly 60% of the vote. He took office on 15 June 2014.

Kiska announced on 15 May 2018 that he will not participate in 2019 presidential election, arguing that his departure might end "the era of political confrontation" his country faced and citing a desire to spend more time with his family. At the time Kiska made the announcement, polls indicated that he was Slovakia's most trusted politician and that he would have likely been the frontrunner in the election had he chosen to present himself as a candidate.

Foreign policy
Kiska supports Kosovo independence and is in favour of Slovakia diplomatically recognising Kosovo as an independent sovereign state.

Kiska has also come out against Russia over the Ukraine conflict and supports sanctions.

Honours and awards
 : Order of the White Double Cross
 : Order of Ľudovít Štúr
 : Pribina Cross
 : Order of Andrej Hlinka

Foreign honours
 : Grand Star of the Decoration of Honour for Services to the Republic of Austria
 : Collar of the Order of the Cross of Terra Mariana
 : Grand Cross Special Class of the Order of Merit of the Federal Republic of Germany
 : Grand Cross of the Order of Saint-Charles
 : Grand Cross of the Order of St. Olav
 : Collar of the Order of the Star of Romania
 : Knight of the Order of the White Eagle
: European Civil Rights Prize of the Sinti and Roma

References

External links 

 

1963 births
Living people
People from Poprad
Presidents of Slovakia
Slovak businesspeople
Grand Crosses Special Class of the Order of Merit of the Federal Republic of Germany
Slovak University of Technology in Bratislava alumni
Recipients of the Collar of the Order of the Cross of Terra Mariana
For the People (Slovakia) politicians
First Class of the Order of the Star of Romania